Aleksandr Anatolyevich Vlasov (born 23 April 1996) is a Russian cyclist who rides for UCI WorldTeam .

Career

Astana (2020–21)
In October 2020, he was named in the startlists for the Giro d'Italia and the Vuelta a España, where he finished 11th overall. In 2021, he finished second in Paris–Nice, and finished just off the podium in the Giro d'Italia.

Bora–Hansgrohe
In August 2021, Vlasov was announced to be moving to the  team, signing an initial three-year contract from 2022. Vlasov made his first start with the team at January's Challenge Mallorca, finishing third in the Trofeo Pollença – Port d'Andratx. He assumed the overall race lead, which he held to the end of the race. He took four further top-five results over the next two months, placing fourth overall at the UAE Tour, second at the GP Miguel Induráin, third overall at the Tour of the Basque Country, and third at La Flèche Wallonne. Following this run of results, Vlasov next competed at the Tour de Romandie, where he was third overall going into the final stage, behind Rohan Dennis and Juan Ayuso. The final stage was a primarily uphill  individual time trial between the World Cycling Centre in Aigle and the ski resort of Villars-sur-Ollon; Vlasov won the stage by more than half a minute from his next closest challenger Simon Geschke, and with Ayuso and Dennis each losing more than a minute, Vlasov also won the overall general classification.

In preparation for the Tour de France, Vlasov aimed for a 3rd stage race victory of 2022 in the Tour de Suisse, and won the 5th stage to Novazzano, taking the race lead before the first mountain stages. However, Vlasov along with several other riders had to abandon the race the next day after testing positive for Covid 19, hindering his Tour de France preparation. 

He went into the 2022 Tour de France, his first Tour entry, with high GC aspirations, but ran into bad luck early in the race. Before the serious mountain stages even started his chances for a high finish took a severe hit. As the race progressed he moved back up in the standings. He made his final jump up to 5th place overall by riding considerably better than Quintana and Meintjes, who were ahead of him to start the day, in the individual time trial on stage 20.

Major results

2014
 1st  Overall GP Général Patton
1st Stage 2
 6th Overall Trofeo Karlsberg
2015
 3rd Coppa della Pace
2016
 6th GP Capodarco
 9th Giro del Medio Brenta
2017
 4th Gran Premio di Poggiana
 9th Overall Giro della Valle d'Aosta
 9th Piccolo Giro di Lombardia
 9th Trofeo Città di San Vendemiano
2018
 1st  Overall Giro Ciclistico d'Italia
 2nd Overall Toscana-Terra di Ciclismo
1st  Mountains classification
1st Stage 2
 3rd Overall Sibiu Cycling Tour
 4th Overall Tour de l'Avenir
 6th Giro del Belvedere
2019
 1st  Road race, National Road Championships
 2nd Overall Tour of Almaty
 3rd Overall Tour of Slovenia
1st  Mountains classification
 3rd Overall Vuelta a Asturias
 4th Overall Giro di Sicilia
 5th Overall Tour of Austria
1st Stage 6
 8th Overall Vuelta a Andalucía
 8th Overall Settimana Internazionale di Coppi e Bartali
 9th Coppa Agostoni
 10th Overall Tour of the Alps
2020
 1st Giro dell'Emilia
 1st Mont Ventoux Dénivelé Challenge
 2nd Overall Tour de la Provence
1st  Young rider classification
1st Stage 2
 3rd Overall Route d'Occitanie
 3rd Giro di Lombardia
 4th Gran Piemonte
 5th Overall Tirreno–Adriatico
1st  Young rider classification
2021
 1st  Time trial, National Road Championships
 2nd Overall Paris–Nice
1st  Young rider classification
 3rd Overall Tour of the Alps
 4th Overall Giro d'Italia
 6th Classic Sud-Ardèche
 10th Overall Tour de la Provence
2022
 1st  Overall Tour de Romandie
1st Stage 5 (ITT)
 1st  Overall Volta a la Comunitat Valenciana
1st Stage 3
 1st Stage 5 Tour de Suisse
 2nd GP Miguel Induráin
 3rd Overall Tour of the Basque Country
 3rd La Flèche Wallonne
 3rd Trofeo Pollença–Port d'Andratx
 4th Overall UAE Tour
 5th Overall Tour de France
 5th Coppa Sabatini
2023
 5th Overall Volta a la Comunitat Valenciana
 9th Overall Tirreno–Adriatico

General classification results timeline

References

External links

 
 
 
 
 
 

1996 births
Living people
Russian male cyclists
Sportspeople from Vyborg
Olympic cyclists of Russia
Cyclists at the 2020 Summer Olympics
Tour de Suisse stage winners
Russian State University of Physical Education, Sport, Youth and Tourism, Department of Chess alumni